Dastjerdeh-ye Olya (also Romanized as Dastjerdeh-ye ‘Olyā; also known as Dastjerdeh, Dastjerdeh-ye Bālā, and Dastjerd-e ‘Olyā) is a village in Dinavar Rural District, Dinavar District, Sahneh County, Kermanshah Province, Iran. At the 2006 census, its population was 94, in 25 families.

References 

Populated places in Sahneh County